Gilbert Hoef (born 31 December 1945) is a Belgian sports shooter. He competed at the 1980 Summer Olympics and the 1984 Summer Olympics.

References

1945 births
Living people
Belgian male sport shooters
Olympic shooters of Belgium
Shooters at the 1980 Summer Olympics
Shooters at the 1984 Summer Olympics
Sportspeople from Bruges